Henry Beeston DCL  was an English educator in the last decades of the 17th Century.

Beeston was born in Huntingdonshire. He was the eldest son of William Beeston of Possbrook, Titchfield, and Elizabeth Bromfield. William Beeston used the coat of arms of the Cheshire Beeston family but his connections are obscure.

He graduated BCL from New College, Oxford in 1653 and became a Fellow there. He was Headmaster of Winchester College from 1658 until 1679; and Warden of New College from 1679 until his death.

His younger brother William Beeston was Governor of Jamaica.

References

People from Huntingdonshire
1701 deaths
Headmasters of Winchester College
Wardens of New College, Oxford
17th-century scholars